Flint Creek Power Plant is a base load, coal fired, electrical power station located west of Gentry, Arkansas in Benton County, Arkansas.

The lone unit uses coal mined from the Powder River Basin shipped via Kansas City Southern Railway. The output is owned jointly half and half by SWEPCO/AEP and Arkansas Electric Cooperative Corp.

As part of the project, SWEPCO constructed a 100’ high dam on Little Flint Creek to create a reservoir to provide cooling water to the plant.  The reservoir, known as Lake Flint Creek or SWEPCO Lake, provides fishing opportunities and is open to the public.

Units

See also

 List of power stations in Arkansas
 Global warming
 List of coal-fired power station in the United States

References

External links
http://www.AEP.com/
 Data on generation and fuel consumption from the Energy Information Administration Electricity Data Browser

Energy infrastructure completed in 1978
Buildings and structures in Benton County, Arkansas
Coal-fired power stations in Arkansas
1978 establishments in Arkansas